Parectropis is a genus in the geometer moth family (Geometridae). A small Old World genus, it contains only a good dozen species altogether, though new ones are still being discovered. Only one species (P. similaria) is found in Europe; most others live in Asia though some occur in Africa.

Selected species
Species of Parectropis include:
 Parectropis alticolaria Krüger, 2005
 Parectropis delosaria (Walker, [1863]) (formerly in Ectropis)
 Parectropis extersaria (Hübner, 1799) (sometimes in P. similaria)
 Parectropis fansipana Sato, 2006
 Parectropis nigrosparsa (Wileman & South, 1923)
 Parectropis paracyclophora Sato & M.Wang, 2006
 Parectropis pectinicornis Krüger, 2005
 Parectropis siamensis
 Parectropis similaria (Hufnagel, 1767)
 Parectropis simplex (Warren, 1914) (formerly in Ectropis)
 Parectropis subflava (Bastelberger, 1909) (formerly in Ectropis)
 Parectropis 'Camdeboo Mountains'
 Parectropis 'Sterkstroom'

Footnotes

References

  (2011): Parectropis. Version 2.4, 2011-JAN-27. Retrieved 2011-APR-21.
  (2005): New species of geometrid moths from Lesotho (Lepidoptera: Geometroidea: Geometridae). Annals of the Transvaal Museum 42: 19-45. HTML abstract
  (2004): Butterflies and Moths of the World, Generic Names and their Type-species – Parectropis. Version of 2004-NOV-05. Retrieved 2011-APR-21.
  (2001): Markku Savela's Lepidoptera and some other life forms – Parectropis. Version of 2001-OCT-02. Retrieved 2011-APR-21.

Boarmiini